Tony Randolph (born April 1, 1966) is an American politician serving as a member of the South Dakota House of Representatives from the 35th district. He assumed office in 2019. Randolph is the only African American member of the South Dakota Legislature.

Background 
Randolph was born in Franklin, Kentucky. Prior to entering politics, he worked as an electrical contractor. Randolph and his wife, Audrey, have seven children. Randolph is a member of the Republican Party.

References 

Living people
African-American state legislators in South Dakota
Republican Party members of the South Dakota House of Representatives
People from Franklin, Kentucky
1966 births
21st-century American politicians
21st-century African-American politicians
20th-century African-American people